IAVA may refer to:

 Information Assurance Vulnerability Alert
 Iranian Anti-Vivisection Association
 Iraq and Afghanistan Veterans of America